697 Galilea is a minor planet orbiting the Sun. It was named in honor of Galileo Galilei, as it was discovered just after the 300th anniversary of his discovery of the Galilean moons.

References

External links
 
 

Background asteroids
Galilea
Galilea
C-type asteroids (Tholen)
19100214
Galileo Galilei